Rapstrap is a system of securing and bundling together cables, ropes, plants, etc.  It is a reusable plastic strap that is wrapped around the cables, plants, or supports and then cut to size, similarly to cable ties.  However, unlike cable ties, the excess that is cut off can be used again.

Dragons' Den
The inventor of rapstrap, Andrew Harsley, appeared on the Dragons' Den TV show in 2008, and sold 50% of his company for £150,000.  He made a deal with two dragons, James Caan and Duncan Bannatyne.

References

External links
 Rapstrap web site

Fasteners
Electrical safety